Euplatypus parallelus, previously known as Platypus parallelus, is a species of ambrosia beetle in the weevil family Curculionidae. The adults and larvae form galleries in various species of tree and logs. It is native to Central and South America but has spread globally, is present in Africa and is well established in tropical Asia.

Description

Distribution and habitat
Euplatypus parallelus is native to Central and South America, but has spread invasively to Africa, tropical southern Asia, Wallacea and New Guinea, probably via timber imports. It arrived in Africa in the late 1800s and was first recorded in Asia after World War II, became widespread in Sri Lanka in the 1970s and was present in Malaysia, Thailand and Indonesia by the 1980s. It soon became the most significant ambrosia beetle in Thailand, attacking both living trees, typically stressed or diseased specimens, and recently fallen or cut timber. It has been reported in over 80 species of tree from 25 families, including live rubber trees in Brazil and Indian rosewood in Bangladesh. The first recordings from China were made on Hainan Island in 2016.

Ecology
The male beetle excavates a short tunnel in the bark of the host tree or log and then releases a pheromone on the surface which attracts a female. After mating, the female enters the tunnel and creates an extensive series of galleries in which the eggs are laid. Like other ambrosia beetles, the adults carry with them a fungal culture with which they inoculate the walls of the galleries; the female and developing larvae feed exclusively on the mycelia of this cultivated fungal garden. The wood beside the galleries is blackened by the fungus and frass is pushed out of the entrance hole in long strings. After pupation, the new adults emerge into the open through the original entrance hole. The beetles sometimes introduce pathogenic fungi into the tree and have been implicated in transmitting Fusarium, the cause of a wilt disease, in southern Asia.

References

Platypodinae
Beetles of Africa
Beetles of Asia
Beetles of Central America
Beetles of South America
Beetles described in 1801
Taxa named by Johan Christian Fabricius